The 2006 Arab Champions League Final, It was the 22nd final of the UAFA Club Cup and the 3rd under the name of Arab Champions League. the final play as home and away matches, and it was contested between ENPPI of Egypt and Raja CA of Morocco.

Match details

First Leg

Second Leg

References

External links
 Sports.naseej.net
 Uaezoom.com
 Youtube.com
 Youtube.com

2005-06
UAFA
UAFA
2005–06 in Egyptian football
2005–06 in Moroccan football